Pinal Shah (born 3 November 1987, in Baroda) was the wicket-keeper for India U19s World Cup squad. He is an able batsman and has played five first-class matches for Baroda scoring 377 runs, including a blistering 217* against Services in early 2006. He usually bats in the middle-order, but has also opened on occasions.

Shah has played 11 U19 ODI matches for India but has been unable to reproduce the batting form that he has shown so far in his short career with Baroda, his highest score being just 19. He has taken 23 catches at ODI level and is guaranteed a place in the starting eleven for the Under 19 World Cup as he is the squad's specialist wicket-keeper.

References
cricinfo

Indian cricketers
Living people
1987 births
Mumbai Indians cricketers
Rajasthan Royals cricketers
West Zone cricketers
Baroda cricketers
Wicket-keepers